Ptelidium is a genus of flowering plants belonging to the family Celastraceae.

Its native range is Madagascar.

Species:

Ptelidium ovatum 
Ptelidium scandens

References

Celastraceae
Celastrales genera